Sembium is a former panchayat which was annexed to Chennai in 1946. It was a sub-taluk of Saidapettai taluk of Old Chinglepet District.

History
Sembium was an old panchayat comprising villages of Sembium, Ayanavaram, Siruvallur, and Peravallur. Ayanavaram, the major business hub of the North Chennai, was once the part of Sembium Panchayat.

The Sembium - Ayanavaram Municipal council was annexed to the town of St. George in 1946.
After the annexure of Sembium - Ayanavaram, Madras municipality became a city.

Demographics

References

Chennai district
Chinglepet district